The pale leaf-eared mouse (Graomys domorum) is a species of rodent in the family Cricetidae.
It is found in Argentina and Bolivia.

References

Musser, G. G. and M. D. Carleton. 2005. Superfamily Muroidea. pp. 894–1531 in Mammal Species of the World a Taxonomic and Geographic Reference. D. E. Wilson and D. M. Reeder eds. Johns Hopkins University Press, Baltimore.

Graomys
Mammals of Argentina
Mammals of Bolivia
Mammals described in 1902
Taxa named by Oldfield Thomas
Taxonomy articles created by Polbot